Events from the year 2009 in the country of Russia.

Incumbents
President: Dmitry Medvedev
Prime Minister: Vladimir Putin
Minister of Defence: Anatoliy Serdyukov

Events

January
15 January - 2009 Makhachkala Il-76 collision

February 
15 February - New Star incident

June
3 June - 2009 Krasnozavodsk tornado
16 June - 1st BRIC summit
26 June-6 July - Caucasus 2009

July
6 July - The Obama–Medvedev Commission is announced.

August
17 August 
2009 Nazran bombing
2009 Sayano–Shushenskaya power station accident

October
11 October - Moscow City Duma election, 2009

November
1 November - 2009 Yakutia Ilyushin Il-76 crash
27 November - 2009 Nevsky Express bombing

December
5 December - Lame Horse fire

Births

Deaths

January

4 January - Vladimir Repyev, 52, Russian Olympic silver medal-winning (1980) handball player.
8 January - Irène Mélikoff, 91, Russian-born French Turkologist.
13 January - 
 Mikhail Donskoy, 61, Russian programmer, co-developer of the first world computer chess champion (Kaissa).
 Umar Israilov, 27, Russian critic of Chechen President Ramzan Kadyrov, shot.

February

21 February - Ilya Piatetski-Shapiro, 79, Russian-born Israeli mathematician, Parkinson's disease.

October

20 October - Yuri Ryazanov, 22, Russian artistic gymnast, traffic collision.

Full date unknown
Alexandra Ovchinnikova (1914–2009), road engineer and president of Yakutia

See also 
 List of Russian films of 2009

References

External links

 
Years of the 21st century in Russia
2000s in Russia